Giardini is a suburb of Palermo, Sicily. It is further off from the central city. It was important in the history of the Cosa Nostra. 

Zones of Palermo